The Minister of Environment was a cabinet portfolio in Manitoba, Canada. In 1999, it was merged with the responsibilities of the Minister of Natural Resources to create a new Minister of Conservation portfolio.

From 1971 to 1979 responsibility for the environment was included in the remit of the Ministry of Mines, Resources and Environmental Management. It was then shifted to the Ministry of Consumer and Corporate Affairs and Environment from 1979 to 1981.

When Howard Pawley's government took office in late 1981, it established cabinet responsibilities directly related to the environment. The minister responsible was initially designated as the Minister responsible for Environmental Management, with the added responsibility of the administration of the Clean Environment Act, Workers Compensation Act, the Workplace Safety and Health Act, and the Communities Economic Development Fund Act. This was upgraded to a portfolio position in 1983, and the new minister was designated as the Minister of Environment, Workplace Safety and Health. A separate Ministry of Environment was created in 1989.

List of Ministers of Environment

References

Environment, Minister of